Moshe Tamir (1924 – 13 November 2004) was a Russian-born Israeli painter.

Education
After leaving the Bezalel Academy of Arts and Design in Jerusalem in 1944, he moved to the Fine Arts Academy in Rome, Italy, graduating in 1952. He completed his Advance studies at the École des Beaux-Arts, Paris, in 1955.

Awards and commemoration
 1947 Award of Bezalel's Struck prize
 1949 "young Israeli Artists", Tel Aviv Artist's House, winning an award for his painting "Wounded Amnon"
 Chosen among the 20 best young artists in Europe participating in the Exhibition of the Museum of Modern Art in Paris
 1961 First prize of the Museum of Rio de Janeiro  for his  graphic work at the Biennale of São Paulo, Brazil
 1961 Director of "New Bezalel", Jerusalem
 1963 National inspector of the Art Studies, and Art Advisor to the Minister of Culture and Education in Jerusalem
 1980 Interior planning and fresco paintings at the Convention Hall (Palazzo Vecchio)

Collections
 Moshe Tamir Collection at Presler Private Museum, Tel Aviv, Israel
 "Wounded Amnon" Fresco, collection of the Tel Aviv Museum of Art
 Museums of Jerusalem, Tel Aviv, Haifa and Ein Harod, Israel
 Victoria and Albert Museum, London, Amsterdam, Bogota, Caracas, Rio de Janeiro, New York, Chicago, San Francisco, Baltimore, Philadelphia. Denver Art Museum, State Museum of Belgium, SA Private Collection of the Queen Mother of Belgium and many private collections in Israel, Europe, America, South America and Canada

References

Bibliography
 Moshe Tamir, Guy Pieters, 1999
 Moshe Tamir: The Epos and the Myth, Gideon Ofrat.

External links
 http://preslermuseum.com/

1924 births
2004 deaths
20th-century Israeli painters
Soviet emigrants to Israel
Israeli expatriates in Italy
Israeli expatriates in France